The Big Revival Tour presented by Corona Light was the fourteenth headlining concert tour by American country music artist Kenny Chesney, in support of his sixteenth studio album The Big Revival (2014). Ten of the shows were merged with Jason Aldean's Burn It Down Tour. Eric Church co-headlined five of them with Chesney while Miranda Lambert co-headlined the show at Soldier Field in Chicago. This was the biggest country music concert tour of 2015 and the second-ranked North American one of the year, after grossing over $116.4 million.

Background
The tour was first announced in October 2014, when Chesney was promoting his album on Good Morning America. When asked about the tour Chesney says, "I've been ready to get out there for a long time. Now that we're announced I'm fired up! This new music brings a new energy to the show, and it's gonna take what we do to a whole other level. Days after the tour was announced, it was revealed that ten of the shows in the summer would be combined with Jason Aldean's Burn It Down Tour. These ten shows will be played at football stadiums across America. On this ten show merge, Chesney's says; "There aren't a lot of guys out there who can hit it the way Jason does, so I'm glad we're able to bring both of our tours together for 10 nights the summer. I know what me and the guys are bringing in terms of music, and I know Jason can hang with us!" Aldean praised Kenny by saying that he "is the guy everybody in country music looks up to when they think about workin’ hard, building your career out on the road and getting to eventually play stadiums". Chesney also gave Aldean advice when Aldean started playing stadiums a few years ago and the two "have a real friendship."
It was later announced that Chesney will also merge an additional five shows with Eric Church. These shows will also be played at football stadiums.  According to Church, he had a good time in his previous tour with Chesney, and that Chesney is "an artist that isn't afraid to let you come full blast and do what you do. It's rare you get to tour with someone you respect and you are friends with. I can't wait to do it again."

Additional solo dates were announced in January 2015.

Set list
"Drink It Up"
"Reality"
"Beer In Mexico"
"Keg In The Closet"
"Til It's Gone"
"Summertime"
"Pirate Flag"
"No Shoes, No Shirt, No Problems"
"Big Star"
"Somewhere with You"
"I Go Back"
"Old Blue Chair"
"Living In Fast Forward"
"Young"
"Whole Lotta Rosie" 
"American Kids"
"Anything but Mine"
"There Goes My Life"
"How Forever Feels"
"Never Wanted Nothing More"
"When The Sun Goes Down"
"Don't Happen Twice"
"Out Last Night"
"The Boys of Fall"
"You and Tequila"
"She Thinks My Tractor's Sexy"

Opening acts
Jake Owen (select dates)
Brantley Gilbert (select dates)
Cole Swindell (select dates)
Chase Rice (select dates)
Old Dominion (select dates)

Tour dates

Notes
 These shows are with Jason Aldean.
 These shows are with Eric Church.
 This show is with Miranda Lambert.
 This show is with Chase Rice only.

Blood marrow donations
For this tour Chensey's No Shoes Nation teamed up with the Love Hope Strength Foundation's Get on the List Campaign. At the stadium shows fans could sign up to be bone marrow donors and the donors were then entered into the national donor bank in cooperation with Delete Blood Cancer. Twenty-five matches were found. About the matches found Chesney stated: "This was something so hard to believe, given how easy and simple it is", "I'm thrilled to hear 25 matches have already been found. Maybe we should call them No Shoes, All Heart Nation."

References

2015 concert tours
Kenny Chesney concert tours